Perpetual Real Estate Services, Inc. v. Michaelson Properties, Inc. 974 F.2d 545 (4th Cir. 1992), is a US corporate law case, concerning piercing the corporate veil.

Facts
Aaron Michaelson (Aaron) formed Michaelson Properties, Inc. (Properties) in 1981 as a business to invest in real estate joint ventures. Aaron was the sole shareholder and the corporation's president.

Properties entered a joint venture with Perpetual Real Estates (Perpetual), forming a partnership called "Arlington Apartment Associates" (AAA) to build condominiums. During the building process AAA needed further financing; Properties could not put up its share, so Perpetual loaned it $1.05 million and got a personal guarantee from Aaron.

However, the condominiums were poorly built, and AAA was successfully sued for $950,000 by several of the purchasers.  Perpetual paid the judgments on behalf of AAA, then sought Properties. Properties did not have the money, and went bankrupt, so Perpetual sued Aaron to pay.

Aaron argued that Properties was a separate legal person, and it was inappropriate to pierce the corporate veil in this circumstance.  However, the jury ruled that it could be pierced and that Aaron should pay. Aaron appealed.

Judgment
Wilkinson J noted that Virginia law had assiduously upheld the "vital economic policy" of respecting a corporation as a separate legal entity, since it underpinned the operation of vast enterprises. He emphasised that the veil would only be lifted where a defendant exercises "undue domination and control" and uses the corporation as "a device or sham... to disguise wrongs, obscure fraud, or conceal crime." He said the description of the law which the jury had heard was in a "rather soggy state" and emphasised that it was not enough that "an injustice or fundamental unfairness" would be perpetrated. "The fact," he continued,

Because there was no evidence that Aaron was attempting to defraud anybody, the veil could not be lifted. There was no "unfair siphoning of funds" when Aaron paid himself a dividend, because distribution was entirely foreseeable when the money was given, and the distribution happened well before any suit was filed. The fact that Aaron had given personal guarantees strengthened the corporate veil presumption, because the transactions recognised it existed.

Cited cases
Cheatle v. Rudd's Swimming Pool Supply Co., 234 Ca. 207, 360 S.E.2d 828 (1987)
Beale v. Kappa Alpha Order,  192 Ca. 382, 64 S.E2d 789 (1951)
Anderson v. Abbott, 321 U.S. 349 (1944)
Dwitt Truck Brokers, Inc. v. W. Ray Flemming Fruit Co., 540 F.2d 681 (4th Cir. 1976)
Cunningham v. Rendezvous, Inc. 699 F.2d 676 (4th Cir. 1983)
United States v. Jon-T Chemicals, Inc. 768 F.2d 686 (5th Cir. 1985)
United Paperworkers Int'l Union v. Penntech Papers, Inc.,  439 F. Supp. 610 (D. Me. 1977)
Aronson v. Price 644, N.E.2d 864 (Ind. 1964) a plaintiff brought his car for repair to "Corbett's Body Shop" which did not indicate its corporate status.
Interocean Shipping Co. v. National Shipping & Trading Corp., 523 F.2d 527 (2d Cir. 1975), conduct akin to fraud required to pierce the veil in contract cases

See also
United States corporate law

References

External links
 

United States corporate case law
United States Court of Appeals for the Fourth Circuit cases
1992 in United States case law
Arlington County, Virginia